Acuaria is a genus of nematodes belonging to the family Acuariidae.

The genus has cosmopolitan distribution.

Species:

Acuaria anthuris 
Acuaria attenuata 
Acuaria brumpti 
Acuaria cordata 
Acuaria dollfusi 
Acuaria europaea 
Acuaria galliardi 
Acuaria gruveli 
Acuaria hamulosa 
Acuaria muscicapae 
Acuaria ornata 
Acuaria papillifera 
Acuaria parorioli 
Acuaria phalacrocoracis 
Acuaria serpentocephala 
Acuaria skrjabini 
Acuaria spiralis 
Acuaria subula 
Acuaria tenuis

References

Nematodes